The 1949 Cotton Bowl Classic was a post-season game between the SMU Mustangs and the Oregon Webfoots. 20 points were scored in the final quarter.

Background
SMU, despite losing for the first time in 1946, had a banner year once again as Doak Walker won the Heisman Trophy and led SMU to their 2nd consecutive Southwest Conference championship and 2nd straight Cotton Bowl. Oregon had only played in two bowl games, the last being the 1920 Rose Bowl. They shared the Pacific Coast Conference championship with California, who they did not play that season. While the Bears got the Rose Bowl, the Webfoots (in a break of PCC tradition) were sent to the Cotton Bowl. They were coached by Jim Aiken and led by Norm Van Brocklin.

Game summary
For the second straight Cotton Bowl, Doak Walker started the scoring, this time with a 1-yard touchdown run. Most notable in the game was SMU's deep punts, one by Doak Walker for 79 and one by Kyle Rote for 84, which was crucial in pinning the Webfoots in their own territory. In the third quarter, Kyle Rote added to the lead with a 36-yard touchdown run. As the fourth quarter began, so did the scoring. Norm Van Brocklin threw a pass to Dick Wilkins to narrow the lead, but the kick failed, making it only 14–6. But SMU retaliated with their own score on a Chicken Roberts touchdown run. Oregon scored once more on a Bob Sanders touchdown run, but that was their last score as the game ended 21–13 in SMU's favor.

Statistics

References

1948–49 NCAA football bowl games
1949
1949
1949
January 1949 sports events in the United States
Cotton Bowl